Fani Madida (born 7 December 1966) is a South African former professional footballer who played as a midfielder or forward in South Africa for Giant Blackpool, Kaizer Chiefs and Hellenic and in Turkey for Beşiktaş, Antalyaspor and Bursaspor.

International career
Madida made his debut for the South Africa national team on 7 July 1992 in a 1–0 win over Cameroon and played his last match on 18 September 1996 in a 2–0 win over Australia coming on for Mark Williams in the 74th minute.

References

External links
 
Profile at Turkish Football Federation

1966 births
Living people
People from Newcastle, KwaZulu-Natal
Soccer players from KwaZulu-Natal
South African soccer players
Association football forwards
Association football midfielders
South Africa international soccer players
Süper Lig players
Kaizer Chiefs F.C. players
Giant Blackpool players
Beşiktaş J.K. footballers
Antalyaspor footballers
Bursaspor footballers
Hellenic F.C. players
South African expatriate soccer players
South African expatriate sportspeople in Turkey
Expatriate footballers in Turkey